This is a list containing the Billboard Hot Latin Tracks number-ones of 2003.

References

United States Latin Songs
2003
2003 in Latin music